William Barrymore (1899–1979) was a Russian-born American film actor active in the silent and early sound era. Born as Elia Bulakh he also acted under the name Boris Bullock and Kit Carson.

Selected filmography
 His Greatest Battle (1925)
 The Range Terror (1925)
 Don X (1925)
 Ridin' Wild (1925)
 Cowboy Courage (1925)
 Racing Romance (1926)
 Twin Six O'Brien (1926)
 Walloping Kid (1926)
 Prince of the Saddle (1926)
 Lawless Trails (1926)
 The Millionaire Orphan (1926)
 The Grey Vulture (1926)
 Pony Express Rider (1926)
 Across the Plains (1928)
 Cheyenne Trails (1928)
 Midnight on the Barbary Coast (1929)
 Forgotten Commandments (1932)
 Lightning Range (1933)
 The Fighting Cowboy (1933)
 Rawhide Romance (1934)
 The Rawhide Terror (1934)
 The Whirlwind Rider (1934)

References

Bibliography
 Katchmer, George A. A Biographical Dictionary of Silent Film Western Actors and Actresses. McFarland, 2015.

 Pitts, Michael R. Poverty Row Studios, 1929–1940: An Illustrated History of 55 Independent Film Companies, with a Filmography for Each. McFarland & Company, 2005.

External links

1899 births
1979 deaths
American male film actors
Russian male film actors
Emigrants from the Russian Empire to the United States